Joseph Henry Widdifield (June 12, 1845 – June 3, 1906) was an Ontario physician and political figure. He represented York North in the Legislative Assembly of Ontario as a Liberal member from 1875 to 1888.

He was born in Whitchurch, Upper Canada in 1845, the son of Charles Ellis Widdifield, and studied medicine at Victoria College and St Thomas's Hospital Medical School in London. On his return to Canada, Widdifield set up practice in Newmarket. He served as a coroner and justice of the peace of Victoria County. He also served in the militia during the Fenian raids. He was whip for the provincial Liberal party from 1877 to 1883. Widdifield served as deputy Grand Master for the Masonic order in the Toronto district and also served as provincial medical examiner for the order. In 1888, he resigned his seat in the assembly to accept the position of sheriff for York County.

In 1965, Widdifield Secondary School in the Widdifield District of North Bay was named after him.

External links

The Canadian parliamentary companion, 1887 JA Gemmill
A Cyclopæedia of Canadian biography : being chiefly men of the time ... GM Rose (1886)
Commemorative biographical record of the county of York, Ontario ... (1907)

1845 births
1906 deaths
Ontario Liberal Party MPPs
People of the Fenian raids
People from Whitchurch-Stouffville
Canadian justices of the peace
Canadian coroners